John Pullein  FRCO (b. 1878) was an organist and composer based in England.

Life

He was born in Lincoln in 1878, the son of William Pullein and Hannah Rose. His father was a Professor of Music.

His three younger brothers, William Rose Pullein, Frank Pullein and Ernest Pullein were also organists.

He was in the choir of Lincoln Cathedral as a boy, and then an articled pupil of G.J. Bennett and then assistant organist.

Appointments

Organist of St. Helen's Church, Willingham by Stow
Organist of St. Swithin's Church, Lincoln 1896 - 1903 
Organist of St. Peter's Church, Harrogate 1903 - 1917
Organist of St. Mary's Cathedral, Glasgow 1917 - ????

Compositions

He composed Songs, part songs, organ and church music.

References

1878 births
English organists
British male organists
English composers
Fellows of the Royal College of Organists
Year of death missing
People from Lincoln, England